This article presents the national team appearances in the women's Olympic water polo tournament since the inaugural official edition in 2000.

As of 2016, Thirteen women's national water polo teams from five continents have competed at the Summer Olympics. Four teams have won all five tournaments. The inaugural winners in 2000 were Australia; the current champions are United States. The most successful team is currently United States women's team, who has won the Olympic title on two occasions.

Abbreviations

Team statistics

Comprehensive team results by tournament

Debut of teams
Last updated: 24 January 2021.

Legend
 Team* – Host team

Number of appearances by team

Results of host teams
Last updated: 7 August 2021.

Legend and abbreviation
 Year* – As host team
 Finish‡ – It is the best performance of the team
 Apps – Appearances

Results of defending champions and runners-up
Last updated: 7 August 2021.

Legend
 Team* – Host team

Best finishes by team

Finishes in the top four

Medal table

Longest active appearance droughts
The following table is pre-sorted by number of Olympic tournaments missed (in descending order), year of the last appearance (in ascending order), name of the team (in ascending order), respectively. Last updated: 7 August 2021.

Notes:
 Does not include teams that have not yet made their first appearance at the Olympics or teams that no longer exist.

Legend
 Year* – As host team

Longest appearance droughts overall
The following table is pre-sorted by number of Olympic tournaments missed (in descending order), year of the previous appearance (in ascending order), name of the team (in ascending order), respectively. Last updated: 7 August 2021.

Notes:
 Only includes droughts begun after a team's first appearance and until the team ceased to exist.
 With the exception of 1916, 1940 and 1944, does not include droughts when the Olympic tournament was not held due to World War I and II.

Legend
 Year* – As host team
 Team† – Defunct team

Team records
Teams having equal quantities in the tables below are ordered by the tournament the quantity was attained in (the teams that attained the quantity first are listed first). If the quantity was attained by more than one team in the same tournament, these teams are ordered alphabetically. Last updated: 7 August 2021.

Legend
 Year* – As host team

Appearances
 Most appearances 6, Australia, United States (have participated in every tournament).
 Most appearances, never winning a title 5, Russia (has participated in every tournament).
 Most appearances, never finishing in the top two 5, Russia (has participated in every tournament).
 Most appearances, never winning a medal 4, China (2008*, 2012, 2016, 2020).
 Most appearances, never finishing in the top four 4, China (2008*, 2012, 2016, 2020).
 Fewest appearances 1, Great Britain (2012*), Brazil (2016*), Japan (2020*), ROC (2020), South Africa (2020).
 Fewest appearances, winning a title 3, Netherlands (2008).
 Fewest appearances, finishing in the top two 2, Greece (2004*).
 Fewest appearances, winning a medal 2, Greece (2004*).
 Fewest appearances, finishing in the top four 2, Greece (2004*).

Top four
 Most titles won 3, United States (2012, 2016, 2020).
 Most second-place finishes 2, United States (2000, 2008), Spain (2012, 2020).
 Most third-place finishes 2, Australia (2008, 2012), Russia (2000, 2016).
 Most fourth-place finishes 3, Hungary (2008, 2012, 2016).
 Most finishes in the top two 5, United States (2000, 2008, 2012, 2016, 2020).
 Most finishes in the top two, never winning a title 2, Spain (2012, 2020).
 Most finishes in the top three 6, United States (has been medaled in every tournament).
 Most finishes in the top three, never winning a title 2, Russia (2000, 2016), Spain (2012, 2020).
 Most finishes in the top three, never finishing in the top two 2, Russia (2000, 2016).
 Most finishes in the top four 6, United States (has finished in the top four in every tournament).
 Most finishes in the top four, never winning a title 4, Hungary (2008, 2012, 2016, 2020).
 Most finishes in the top four, never finishing in the top two 4, Hungary (2008, 2012, 2016, 2020).
 Most finishes in the top four, never winning a medal 1, ROC (2020).
 Fewest finishes in the top two, winning a title 1, Australia (2000*), Netherlands (2008).
 Fewest finishes in the top three, winning a title 1, Netherlands (2008).
 Fewest finishes in the top three, finishing in the top two 1, Greece (2004*), Netherlands (2008).
 Fewest finishes in the top four, winning a title 2, Netherlands (2000, 2008), Italy (2004, 2016).
 Fewest finishes in the top four, finishing in the top two 1, Greece (2004*).
 Fewest finishes in the top four, winning a medal 1, Greece (2004*).

Consecutive
 Most consecutive titles won 3, United States (2012–2016–2020).
 Most consecutive second-place finishes None.
 Most consecutive third-place finishes 2, Australia (2008–2012).
 Most consecutive fourth-place finishes 3, Hungary (2008–2012–2016).
 Most consecutive finishes in the top two 4, United States (2008–2012–2016–2020).
 Most consecutive finishes in the top three 6, United States (has been medaled in every tournament).
 Most consecutive finishes in the top four 6, United States (has finished in the top four in every tournament).
 Most consecutive appearances 6, Australia, United States (have participated in every tournament).
 Biggest improvement in position in consecutive tournaments Did not participate/qualify, then won the title, Italy (2000–2004), Netherlands (2004–2008).

Gaps
 Longest gap between successive titles None.
 Longest gap between successive second-place finishes 9 years, Spain (2012, 2020).
 Longest gap between successive third-place finishes 16 years, Russia (2000, 2016).
 Longest gap between successive fourth-place finishes None.
 Longest gap between successive appearances in the top two 12 years, Italy (2004–2016).
 Longest gap between successive appearances in the top three 16 years, Russia (2000–2016).
 Longest gap between successive appearances in the top four 16 years, Russia (2000–2016).
 Longest gap between successive appearances 17 years, Canada (2004–2020).

Debuting teams
 Best finish by a debuting team Champions, Australia (2000*), Italy (2004).
 Worst finish by a debuting team 10th position (last position), South Africa (2020).

Host teams
 Best finish by host team Champions: Australia (2000*).
 Worst finish by host team 9th position, Japan (2020*).
 Best finish by last host team 4th position, Australia (2004).
 Worst finish by last host team Did not participate/qualify, Great Britain (2016), Brazil (2020).
 Worst finish by last host team that participates in the tournament 8th position (last position), Greece (2008).
 Had its best performance as hosts Champions, Australia (2000*).Runners-up, Greece (2004*).5th position, China (2008*).8th position, Great Britain (2012*), Brazil (2016*).9th position, Japan (2020*).
 Had its worst performance as hosts 8th position, Great Britain (2012*), Brazil (2016*).9th position, Japan (2020*).

Defending champions
 Best finish by defending champions Champions, United States (2016, 2020).
 Worst finish by defending champions Did not participate/qualify, Netherlands (2012).
 Worst finish by defending champions that participates in the next tournament 6th position, Italy (2008).

Defending runners-up
 Best finish by defending runners-up Champions, United States (2012).
 Worst finish by defending runners-up Did not participate/qualify, Italy (2020).
 Worst finish by defending runners-up that participates in the next tournament 8th position (last position), Greece (2008).

Population
 Most populous country, participant China (2020), 1,411,099,000 (source)
 Least populous country, participant Hungary (2020), 9,750,000 (source)
 Most populous country, hosts China (2008*), 1,324,655,000 (source)
 Least populous country, hosts Greece (2004*), 10,955,000 (source)
 Most populous country, champions United States (2020), 331,449,000 (source)
 Least populous country, champions Netherlands (2008), 16,446,000 (source)
 Most populous country, runners-up United States (2008), 304,375,000 (source)
 Least populous country, runners-up Greece (2004*), 10,955,000 (source)
 Most populous country, third place United States (2004), 293,046,000 (source)
 Least populous country, third place Hungary (2020), 9,750,000 (source)
 Most populous country, fourth place Australia (2004), 19,895,000 (source)
 Least populous country, fourth place Hungary (2016), 9,830,485 (source)

Confederation statistics

Number of teams by confederation
This is a summary of the total number of participating teams by confederation in each tournament. Last updated: 7 August 2021.

Legend
  – Forthcoming tournament

Best performances by tournament

All-time best performances

See also
 Water polo at the Summer Olympics

 Lists of Olympic water polo records and statistics
 List of men's Olympic water polo tournament records and statistics
 List of women's Olympic water polo tournament records and statistics
 List of Olympic champions in men's water polo
 List of Olympic champions in women's water polo
 National team appearances in the men's Olympic water polo tournament
 List of players who have appeared in multiple men's Olympic water polo tournaments
 List of players who have appeared in multiple women's Olympic water polo tournaments
 List of Olympic medalists in water polo (men)
 List of Olympic medalists in water polo (women)
 List of men's Olympic water polo tournament top goalscorers
 List of women's Olympic water polo tournament top goalscorers
 List of men's Olympic water polo tournament goalkeepers
 List of women's Olympic water polo tournament goalkeepers
 List of Olympic venues in water polo

 FINA Water Polo World Rankings
 List of water polo world medalists
 Major achievements in water polo by nation

References

Sources

External links
 Olympic water polo – Official website

National teams, Women